Dead-Shot, Dead Shot, Deadshot, Dead-Shots, Dead Shots, Deadshots or variant may refer to:
 Deadshot (Floyd Lawton), DC comics supervillain
 Charles "Dead Shot" Keen, a character from Billy's Boots
 Lawrence Dead-Shots unit of the Confederate Army, see List of Arkansas Civil War Confederate units
 Linden Dead-Shots unit of the Confederate Army, see 3rd Confederate Infantry Regiment
 a marksman